The 2016–17 KNVB Cup was the 99th season of the annual Dutch national football cup competition. It started on 6 September 2016 with the first of six rounds, and ended on 30 April 2017 with the final played at De Kuip in Rotterdam. 

This edition was notable for several unicums, which included holding the first test in an official match of a top tier-domestic competition of the Video assistant referee-system. Anouar Kali held the distinction of becoming the first player to receive a red card after an intervention from the video referee in the first round-game between Ajax and his team Willem II.

The defending champions were Feyenoord from the Eredivisie, after beating FC Utrecht 2–1 in the final in the previous season on 24 April 2016. 

Vitesse defeated AZ 2–0 in the final to win its first major trophy in the 124-year history of the club.

As winners, Vitesse automatically qualified for the group stage of the 2017–18 edition of the UEFA Europa League. They also participated in the 2017 edition of the Johan Cruyff Shield, the Dutch Supercup match at the start of next season between the Cup winner and the champions of the Eredivisie, Feyenoord.

Calendar

First round
The draw of the first round was done on 27 August 2016. 64 teams participated and played on 20, 21 or 22 September 2016.

Second round
The draw of the first round was done on 22 September 2016. 32 teams participated and matches were played on 25, 26 and 27 October 2016.

The lowest ranked team left was Jodan Boys from the fifth tier of Dutch football.

Third round
The third round draw was held on 27 October 2016. 16 teams participated and the matches were played on 13, 14, and 15 December 2016.

The lowest ranked team left was Jodan Boys from the fifth tier of Dutch football.

Quarter-finals
The quarter-final draw was held on 15 December 2016. 8 teams participated and the matches were played on 24, 25, and 26 January 2017.

The lowest ranked team left were FC Volendam and SC Cambuur from the second tier of Dutch football.

Semi-finals
The 4 winners from the previous round progress to this stage. Cupholders Feyenoord were eliminated in the previous round and therefore no longer active in the competition.

The draw was held on 26 January 2017. Matches were played on 1 and 2 March 2017. The lowest ranked team left was SC Cambuur from the second tier of Dutch football.

Final

The two winners from the previous round progressed to this stage. The winner of the semi-final match between AZ and SC Cambuur was marked as the 'home' team in the final, as that was the first match to be drawn at the draw for the semi-finals. The final took place on 30 April 2017 at De Kuip in Rotterdam.

References

KNVB Cup seasons
Netherlands
Cup